Coolboy is a village in County Wicklow in Ireland. It is located between Tinahely and Carnew, nestled in the middle of Holts Way, close to the scenic location of the Kilcavan Gap.

Location and access 
It is located on the R748 road which links the town of Aughrim with Carnew (via the R747). The village is situated near the southern point of the Wicklow Way which winds through the Wicklow Mountains.

History 
Most of the village dates from the early part of the 19th century. In this time the area was dominated by the Fitzwilliam family who lived in nearby Coolattin House. The Coolattin estate once comprised , had 20,000 tenants and occupied almost a quarter of County Wicklow.

Parish church 
The is no church in Coolboy village. The closest church lies 2 km to the south of the village in the nearby village of Coolafancy, as does the only primary school in the area.

Recreation 
The village has a Gaelic handball alley, home of the Coolboy Handball Team. Coolattin Golf Club is 3 km from Coolboy and is an 18 hole, par 70 course.

Tomnafinnoge Woods, also located nearby, has a number of woodland walking trails. One of these walking routes travels along the line of a former railway, leading to the nearby town of Tinahely. 

An annual agricultural show takes place in Tinahely, near Coolboy, on the first Monday of August (a bank holiday in the Republic of Ireland). The one-day show is held at Fairwood Park and has been running since 1935.

See also 
 List of towns and villages in Ireland

References 

Towns and villages in County Wicklow